May Lamok sa Loob ng Kulambo is a 1984 Philippine comedy film directed by, and produced by Hirene Lopez and Danny L. Zialcita as the film's executive producer. The film stars Gloria Diaz, Eddie Garcia, Amy Austria, and Tommy Abuel.

The film was released in 1984 by Essex Films.

Another related film called, May Daga sa Labas ng Lungga, was released earlier in the same year.

Synopsis

Lauro (Eddie Garcia) is a married man who just loves women. His wife Elena (Gloria Diaz), a beautiful and strong-willed woman is dead set in keeping him from womanizing.

Cast

Gloria Diaz
Eddie Garcia
Amy Austria
Tommy Abuel
Suzanne Gonzales
Lyka Ugarte

References

External links

Films directed by Danny Zialcita